In geometry, the truncated rhombicosidodecahedron is a polyhedron, constructed as a truncated rhombicosidodecahedron. It has 122 faces: 12 decagons, 30 octagons, 20 hexagons, and 60 squares.

Other names
Truncated small rhombicosidodecahedron
Beveled icosidodecahedron

Zonohedron 

As a zonohedron, it can be constructed with all but 30 octagons as regular polygons. It is 2-uniform, with 2 sets of 120 vertices existing on two distances from its center. 

This polyhedron represents the Minkowski sum of a truncated icosidodecahedron, and a rhombic triacontahedron.

Related polyhedra
The truncated icosidodecahedron is similar, with all regular faces, and 4.6.10 vertex figure. Also see the truncated rhombirhombicosidodecahedron.

The truncated rhombicosidodecahedron can be seen in sequence of rectification and truncation operations from the icosidodecahedron. A further alternation step leads to the snub rhombicosidodecahedron.

See also
 Expanded icosidodecahedron
 Truncated rhombicuboctahedron

References

 
 Coxeter Regular Polytopes, Third edition, (1973), Dover edition,  (pp. 145–154 Chapter 8: Truncation)
 John H. Conway, Heidi Burgiel, Chaim Goodman-Strauss, The Symmetries of Things 2008,

External links 
 George Hart's Conway interpreter: generates polyhedra in VRML, taking Conway notation as input

Polyhedra